"Lovin' You" is a song by Kristine W, released as the second and final official single from her second album Stronger.

The song reached #1 on the U.S. Billboard Hot Dance Club Play chart in 2001. "Lovin' You" was Kristine W's fifth song to reach the top on this survey.

Cover Versions
The song was covered by British girl group Atomic Kitten for their third studio album, Ladies Night in 2003.

Use in media
The song was featured on the Showtime hit show Queer as Folk. It appeared on season 1, episode 4 when Emmett and Michael are at Ted's condo. The song was also included on the Season 1 soundtrack.

See also
List of number-one dance hits (United States)

References

2001 singles
Kristine W songs
Songs written by Kristine W
2000 songs
RCA Records singles
Songs written by Vincent DeGiorgio